Ambohimanarina Marovazaha is a rural village in the Analamanga Region, Madagascar, in the district of Anjozorobe.

It has a population of  7,537  inhabitants in 2019.

External links
 mindat.org

Populated places in Analamanga